The 6th Man is the soundtrack album to the 1997 comedy film, The 6th Man. It was released on March 25, 1997, through Hollywood Records and consisted of hip hop music. The soundtrack reached #33 on the Billboard Top R&B/Hip-Hop Albums chart and spawned two singles, "Keep on Risin'" and "Like This and Like That", which made it to #50 and #70 on the Hot R&B Singles chart, respectively.

Track listing
"Like This and Like That" (LaKiesha Berri) - 4:03     
"Superstition" (Doug E. Fresh) - 4:57     
"Keep on Risin'" (JADE featuring Lil' Rachett & Vaz) - 4:46     
"Tasty" (The Pharcyde) - 5:14     
"Deeper than Blood" (Sovory) - 4:19   
"Make Me Say It Again Girl" (Stokley) - 6:35  
"Illest Man" (Guru) - 3:36    
"Down and Dirty" (J'Son) - 3:37   
"Invisible" (Public Demand) - 4:14     
"All He's Supposed to Be" (Johnny Gill) - 4:30    
"Bumpin' Coasties" (Marquis) - 4:19     
"Get Up" (Dominica) - 4:27     
"Trouble" (Ortis) - 4:35
"(Anything Can Happen) Theme from The 6th Man" (Marcus Miller) - 5:22

Hip hop soundtracks
1997 soundtrack albums
Hollywood Records soundtracks
Comedy film soundtracks